The  is an electric multiple unit (EMU) train type operated by the Tokyo subway operator Tokyo Metro on the Tokyo Metro Namboku Line in Tokyo, Japan, since 1991.

Variants

, the fleet consists of 23 six-car sets (numbered 01 to 23), all based at Oji depot in Tokyo.

Prototype
A prototype four-car set was built by Kawasaki Heavy Industries in 1990 (formed of cars 9101-9201-9301-9801) for testing on the Chiyoda Line prior to the opening of the Namboku Line in 1991.

1st batch
Full-production four-car sets 02 to 07 were delivered in 1991 ahead of the Namboku Line opening, followed by an additional set in 1992, set 08, to act as a spare.

The original four-car sets were reformed as six-car sets coinciding with the opening of the extension of the line from Yotsuya to Komagome on 26 March 1996. This was achieved by renumbering the centre cars (9200 and 9300) of sets 02, 04, 06, and 08 as 9600 and 9700 cars which were inserted into sets 01, 03, 05, and 07. New-build (2nd batch) intermediate cars (9200-9300-9600-9700) were then inserted into sets 02, 04, 06, and 08. The resulting minor differences led to odd-numbered sets 01 to 07 being classified as "A sets", and even-numbered sets 02 to 08 becoming "B sets".

2nd batch
Four new six-car sets (09 to 13) plus the four sets of four additional intermediate cars described above were built by Kawasaki Heavy Industries between 1995 and 1996, coinciding with the opening of the extension of the line from Yotsuya to Komagome in March 1996.

3rd batch
Externally and internally, these were identical to the 2nd-batch trains.

4th batch
Six new six-car sets (16 to 21) were built by Nippon Sharyo between 1999 and 2000 ahead of the opening of the extension of the line from Tameike-Sannō to Meguro on 26 September 2000. The motored cars 3 (9300) and 4 (9600) in these sets have only one powered bogie, as opposed to two on earlier sets. Friction stir welding was used in the construction of these sets to produce a more attractive exterior finish.

5th batch
Two new six-car sets (22 and 23) entered service from 22 May 2009. These include a number of design improvements over earlier sets, including a redesigned front end, single-arm pantographs, and improved air-conditioning. The number of motored cars is reduced from four to three per 6-car set, with car 3 (trailer car) numbered in the 9400 series. Car 4 (9600) has both bogies powered.

Formations

Sets 01 to 21
The 1st to 4th batch sets (01-21) are formed identically as follows, with four motored ("M") cars and two non-powered trailer ("T") cars, and car 1 at the northern end. Motored cars 3 and 4 in sets 16 to 21 each have only one motored bogie.

 Cars 2 and 4 each have two lozenge-type pantographs.
 Cars 2 and 5 have wheelchair spaces.
 Car 4 is designated as a "mildly air-conditioned" car.

Sets 22 and 23
The two fifth-batch sets are formed as follows, with three motored ("M") cars and three non-powered trailer ("T") cars, and car 1 at the northern end.

 Car 2 has one single-arm pantograph, and car 4 has two.
 Cars 2 and 5 have wheelchair spaces.
 Car 4 is designated as a "mildly air-conditioned" car.

Interior

Refurbishment

The early sets (01 to 08) are scheduled to undergo a programme of refurbishment from 2016, with the first treated sets returning to service from August 2016. Internally, the transverse seating bays at the ends of cars will be replaced by longitudinal bench seats, and wheelchair spaces will be added to one end of each car. Externally, the refurbished sets will receive a revised livery with wavy turquoise and white stripes at waist height and shoulder height to make the line colour more visible at stations with platform edge doors.

Future 
The 9000 series sets are expected to be lengthened from 6 cars to 8 cars per set from 2022 as a means to mitigate congestion on the Namboku Line.

In October 2021, two intermediate cars, numbered 9409 and 9509, were delivered from Kawasaki Heavy Industries' Hyogo plant.

Equipment

References

External links

 Tokyo Metro Namboku Line 9000 series information 

Electric multiple units of Japan
9000 series
Tokyu Car multiple units
Kawasaki multiple units
Nippon Sharyo multiple units
Train-related introductions in 1991
1500 V DC multiple units of Japan